The Leccese or  Moscia Leccese is a breed of domestic sheep indigenous to the Salento peninsula, in Puglia, southern Italy. Its name derives from that of Lecce, the principal city of the peninsula. Like the Pinzirita and the Altamurana, it belongs to the Zackel sheep group. It is a hardy and frugal breed, usually kept in semi-feral herds, capable of surviving year-round on pasture alone. The wool is normally white and the skin flesh-coloured with darker mottlings. In a small proportion of animals the wool is entirely black, and the skin is also black; these black-skinned sheep are resistant to the effects of the poisonous Hypericum crispum, common in the Salento, which in the white-woolled, pale-skinned sheep causes photosensitivity and thus dermatitis.

The Leccese is one of the seventeen autochthonous Italian sheep breeds for which a genealogical herdbook is kept by the Associazione Nazionale della Pastorizia, the Italian national association of sheep-breeders. The herd-book was established in 1972. Total numbers for the breed were estimated at 240,000 in 1983; in 2013 the number recorded in the herd-book was 574.

The milk has 7% fat and 6.5% protein.

References

Sheep breeds originating in Italy